Gaillac-Toulza is a commune in the Haute-Garonne department in southwestern France.

Geography
The commune is bordered by eleven other communes, four of them is in Haute-Garonne, and seven of them is in Ariège: Caujac to the north, Cintegabelle to the to the northeast, Esperce to the northwest, and finally by the department of Ariège by the communes of Saint-Quirc to the northwest, Lissac and Labatut to the east, Canté to the east, Villeneuve-du-Latou to the southwest, Saint-Ybars to the west, and finally by Lézat-sur-Lèze to the northwest.

Population

See also
Communes of the Haute-Garonne department

References

Communes of Haute-Garonne